is a manga series by Youkow Osada that was serialized in the Weekly Comic Bunch from 2006 to 2007. It is a spinoff of the manga series Fist of the North Star by Buronson and Tetsuo Hara. The story centers on the Fist of the North Star antagonist Raoh and depicts his rise to power as the conqueror of a post-apocalyptic world prior to and during the events of the original work. The story of Legends of the Dark King also incorporates elements introduced in the Fist of the North Star: The Legends of the True Savior movie series, including Raoh's childhood friends of Reina and Souga, who help him establish his army.

The manga was adapted into a 13-episode anime series produced by Satelight and aired on Tokyo MX and other stations in late 2008. The anime has been licensed for North America by Sentai Filmworks under the title Legends of the Dark King: A Fist of the North Star Story and distributed by Section23 Films, The complete series was released on a DVD set on September 15, 2009. The series was re-released with the English dub on DVD and Blu-ray on July 20, 2010.

Plot
A global-scale nuclear war has transformed most of the Earth into a barren ocean-less wasteland, resulting in the downfall of modern civilization and a return to a lawless age of barbarism. The survivors of mankind begin to fight each other over the limited supply of uncontaminated food and water still left in the world. The strong ones begin to band together in gangs and armies, fighting each other over territory, while oppressing the weak. A man named Raoh appears, seeking to establish order in the post-apocalyptic world through his mastery of the martial art of Hokuto Shinken. With the help of his childhood friends Reina and Souga, Raoh takes on the mantle of the "King of Fist", as he gradually extends his reign, recruiting new allies in the process, while fighting against rival warlords who seek to challenge his authority.

Characters

Main characters

The eldest of four adoptive brothers trained in the assassination art of Hokuto Shinken.

 The female Captain of the King of Fist's Royal Guards, nicknamed . A childhood friend of Raoh who fled from the Land of Asura to help Raoh build his army. Originally a character from the 2006 animated film Hokuto no Ken - Raō Den Gekitō no Shō.

The Strategist of the King of Fist's Army and Reina's elder brother, nicknamed . In the past, he sacrificed his right leg to help Raoh and Reina escape from Cassandra, which was then replaced by a mechanical prosthetic, increasing the power to his kick. Like Reina, he was originally a character from the 2006 anime film Hokuto no Ken - Raō Den Gekitō no Shō.

An anime-only character (though she appears in a brief tie-in comic published before the anime). A mysterious woman with an unknown agenda who joins the King of Fist's Army as their second strategist. After joining Raoh, she becomes an acquaintance of Toki, regularly visiting him in Cassandra to report the progress of Raoh and Kenshiro, with only Reina aware of her actions. At the climax of Thouzer and Raoh's battle, she determines that both are unworthy of being ruler because of Thouzer's lack of love and Raoh's lack of sadness, indicating there is an individual who possesses both traits that's deserving of being ruler.

The King of Fist's Army's initial trek to the valley causes them to lose almost all of their Invasionary Force. When Raoh goes to the valley himself to confront the horses, he stumbles into Black King himself, who is protecting an injured foal from two wild tigers. Raoh euthanize the dying foal so the Black King could fight without intervention. After winning Black King's respect, him and his herd becomes the steeds of the King of Fist's Army.

The King of Fist's Army
 

A convicted ruffian who desires to create a legacy for himself. He is imprisoned at Cassandra by Gion's men, who are unable to tame him after he survives five death sentences. When Raoh arrives to meet him, the two duel in a test of strength, ending in a draw.  Afterward, he tells Raoh his ambition of being a legend, which wins him over to his favor and he becomes the new warden of Cassandra.  His first order of business as Warden was to procure a "cool" helmet like Raoh's.

 
A member of the King of Fist's Reconnaissance Unit. A former acupuncture specialist who holds a grudge against Toki after being scolded for mistreating one of Toki's patients. After Toki is captured, Amiba takes over Toki's identity and begins to kill his patients, tarnishing Toki's reputation in the process. Amiba does not appear in the anime.

 

He is also Juza and Yuria's older brother. He decides to join Raoh's army after witnessing his battle with Ryuroh, believing that the only way to achieve order in the world is through force. His other hidden agenda is rescuing his sister Yuria from the man named "King". Unfortunately, he learns from his younger brother, Juza, about her fate. Afterward, he continues to serve Raoh.

 

A member of the King of Fist's Reconnaissance Unit who informs Souga of Kenshiro's progress.

 
 The vice-strategist of the King of Fist's Army. A toad-like underling with a dubious personality who seems to be disliked by Raoh. He is the one who orders Amiba to capture Toki. Usa does not appear in this anime version, his role as Raoh's second strategist is served by Sakuya instead.

Rival warlords and gangs

His body possesses a secret that grants him immunity to Hokuto Shinken's application of vital points.

He shifts his allegiance between Raoh and Thouzer, changing from one side to the other depending on which side benefits him the most at the moment.

 
 
The leader of a biker gang who is killed by Raoh at the beginning of the story.

 

After being defeated by Raoh, his castle and his army are taken over by Raoh.

 

 A warlord who leads the King of Fist's army to the Valley of the Black King, where they ended up being trampled to death by a herd of wild horses. After Raoh tames the Black King and his herd, Gion surrenders and becomes a sycophantic servant to the King of Fist. He is initially assigned as the Warden of Cassandra, but is demoted to assistant warden after Uighur takes his place.

  and 

Two masters of the  who serve Thouzer's army.

 
 
 Mentioned by name only in the manga. In the anime, he is the womanizing ruler of the seemingly impregnable . Sakuya infiltrates the castle by seducing Gaoh and has him assassinated by Reina's sniper arrow.

 
 
Appears only in the anime.

 

In order to defend his city from invading forces, he fortified his entire city with traps. However, the traps were so elaborate that many of Amon's own people, including his own son , were killed by them. Eventually the Dragon Emperor's Army lost their morale and abandoned Amon, leaving only his younger twin brother and former General, who continued supporting Amon out of pity.

 
 
Igor conspired with the Thunder Emperor's Army in order to invade the King of Fist's fortress with a pincer attack. He is defeated by the combined force of Ryuga and Souga. His skull is later made into a wineglass used by Raoh and his men during the subsequent victory celebration.

 
 A masked warlord whose his right arm is equipped with a specialized glove that shoots out electric bolts. He conspired with the Lion King's Army to invade the King of Fist's fortress with a pincer attack, but his entire right army is destroyed by Raoh during the fight. Like Igor, his skull is made into as a wineglass in Raoh's victory celebration.

 
When Raoh learns that Shin's ambition drove Yuria to suicide, Raoh decides not to pursue battle, letting Kenshiro and Shin to settle matters between themselves.

 
 
He briefly faces Ryuga, but his life is saved due to Juza's intervention.

 
 
 A warlord who is seduced and killed by Isabella.

He succeeded in capturing Reina and was close to making her one of Juda's slaves until Raoh broke into the UD Gang's stronghold and scared him. He is further frightened when Raoh reveals that Juda was still in the hideout aware of his actions, resulting in Juda appearing behind him.

A female assassin who serves Dagale. She is scarred behind the neck during a struggle by Salim and thus is cast out from the UD Gang by Dagale. In the anime, she is imprisoned and tortured, only to escape with Reina's help, but is struck by an arrow on her way out and dies.

A diminutive underling of Dagale, who helps him capture Reina; only to be frightened when Raoh crashes through the entrance of their hideout.

 The third of the four brothers trained by Master Ryuken. He harbors an intense hatred for Kenshiro, the youngest brother, for disfiguring his face and having obtained the title of successor over him. He confronts Reina and Souga, but decides to hold a truce with them when he realizes they're working for Raoh, his eldest brother. He does not appear in the anime.

 
 
 Mentioned in the manga, but appears only in the anime.

 A warlord who takes over Southern Cross and God's Land following the death of Shin and the Golan Colonel respectively. He is later killed by Raoh during the events of Raō Den Gekitō no Shō

Gaiya has infiltrated Pluto's Army and taken control of his organization from behind-the-scenes, becoming the army's true leader. His style proves to be too strong for both Souga and Ryuga, who end up fatally wounded from Gaiya's technique. He is also the older brother of Sakuya.

A villain who appears in a special two-part chapter of the Ten no Haō manga. Haderu's underlings are modeled after the other members of Jealkb as well.

Other characters

 Raoh's biological brother and the second of Ryuken's four adopted sons. When he refuses to fight on Raoh's side, he allows himself to be taken to Cassandra and imprisoned, awaiting for Kenshiro's arrival. Sakuya reports to him concerning Raoh and Kenshiro, while mediating in his prison cell.

 

After the 108 sects of Nanto Seiken broke up and began fighting amongst themselves, Ryuroh decided not to be involved in the conflict, choosing to lead a quiet and peaceful life, becoming . He tries to convince Raoh to change his ways and use his power as a force of good like Toki and Kenshiro. Raoh sees this as an act of defiance and mortally wounds him, but realizes that he was dying from an illness after their fight. He makes one last plea to Raoh to change his ways before dying; unfortunately, Raoh tells him that he is unable to grant his request.

 
 
He goes to Southern Cross to rescue his younger half-sister Yuria, only to learn that she apparently took her own life while in Shin's captivity. He then meets Ryuga and Reina in a bar near Southern Cross, where he reveals the truth about Yuria's fate and Shin's war against Kenshiro to them. He remains in Southern Cross awaiting the result of the upcoming battle drinking himself silly.

 
 A female prisoner of Juda who was kidnapped from her home village after her parents were murdered. She helps Reina in escaping from Juda's castle after she is captured by Dagale and Komaku. She does not appear in the anime version, her role in the story being served by Isabella.

 

 The 63rd Grand Master of Hokuto Shinken, and the adoptive father who raised and trained Raoh, Toki, Jagi, and Kenshiro. After naming Kenshiro as his successor, he attempted to dissuade Raoh from using Hokuto Shinken to fulfill his ambition, but suffered a stroke when he confronted him.

 The 64th Grand Master of Hokuto Shinken and the youngest of Ryuken's adoptive sons. Also known as the  He was challenged and defeated by the Nanto Seiken master Shin, who left him for dead and then abducted his fiancee Yuria. Since then, he travels the world to protect the weak from the gangs and warlords threatening their survival, becoming a savior to the common people. Although, he never actually appears in the series, he is mentioned thorough the course of the story by Raoh and other characters.  By the end of the anime series, Cassandra has fallen and he succeeds rescuing Toki leaving Raoh pleased; by the end credits, Raoh screams his name as his figure turns towards him.

Media

Manga
Ten no Haoh was serialized irregularly in Weekly Comic Bunch from issues #231 (March 24, 2006) through #300 (August 24, 2007), lasting a total of 42 chapters (including a two-part epilogue), which were subsequently collected in five tankōbon editions. A two-part special chapter was published in 2008 in the September 12 and 19 issues of Comic Bunch as a tie-in to the anime series.

Volumes

Anime
The anime version of Ten no Haoh, directed by Masashi Abe, aired in Japan on Tokyo MX and other channels from October to December 2008, lasting 13 episodes. The series was licensed for Region 1 by Sentai Filmworks and released on a DVD set on September 15, 2009. Sentai Filmworks re-released Legends of the Dark King with an English dub in 2010. The series was released on Region 2 DVD in six volumes, with the first volume having been released in January 2009.

Episodes

Novelization
A web novelization of Ten no Haoh was published in the Hokuto no Ken DX mobile phone site, lasting six chapters.

Video game
A video game version of Ten no Haō was released by Interchannel for the PlayStation Portable in Japan on January 22, 2009. It is a cel-shaded 3D fighting game featuring 13 playable fighters from the manga and anime. All the characters are voiced by their voice actors from the anime series, with the exception of Raoh, who is voiced by Rikiya Koyama. Jagi and Amiba, who were omitted in the anime, are voiced by Tsuyoshi Aoki and Kazuyuki Okitsu respectively, while Kenshiro, who was unvoiced in the anime, is voiced by Hideo Ishikawa.

References

External links
 Official page from Weekly Comic Bunch 
 Official site for the anime series 
 Official site for the PlayStation Portable game 

Fist of the North Star
Satelight
Japan-exclusive video games
Seinen manga
PlayStation Portable games
PlayStation Portable-only games
Sentai Filmworks
Shinchosha manga